Anglona is a historical region of northern Sardinia, Italy. Its main center is Castelsardo.

Geography
Anglona is bounded by the sea northwards, from east by the Coghinas river, from south by Monte Sassu and from west by the Silis River and the Monte Pilosu.

The territory is  characterized by a prevalence of  hills, with small plateaus of volcanic or limestone origin, lying over a tuff base. The coast shows beaches intermingled with rocky sectors.

Economy
Economy is mostly based on agriculture, especially after the reclamation of the lower Coghinas valley during the 1920s, which has saved the fertile area from floods. The main crops are artichokes and tomatoes.

Starting from the 1970s, the coastal communes have developed a flourishing tourism industry.

Geography of Sardinia